Tivela mactroides is a species of bivalve belonging to the family Veneridae.

The species is found in the Americas.

References

Veneridae